Boban Samuel is an Indian film director who works in Malayalam films. Boban made his directional debut with Janapriyan (2011) and followed it up with Romans (2013).

As director

Filmography

Reference

External links

Malayalam film directors
Living people
Male actors in Malayalam cinema
Year of birth missing (living people)